Space Angel is an animated science fiction television series produced in the United States from early 1962 through 1964.  It used the same Synchro-Vox lip technique as Clutch Cargo, the first cartoon produced by the same studio, Cambria Productions. The show was created by Dick Darley, who also created the 1950-1955 live-action series Space Patrol.

The series chronicled the adventures of three astronauts who worked for the Earth Bureau of Investigation's Interplanetary Space Force on board the spaceship Starduster: Captain/Pilot Scott McCloud, also known as "the Space Angel" (voiced by Ned Lefebver), Electronics/Communications expert Crystal Mace (voiced by Margaret Kerry), and the immensely strong Scottish-born Gunner/Engineer Taurus (voiced by Hal Smith).

Setting and themes
The character name the Space Angel was a secret identity. Scott McCloud had an eyepatch; when he appeared as Space Angel, he would lower the dark-tinted visor on his helmet to conceal his identity.

Apart from the use of Synchro-Vox, animation was very limited, but the static panel art by the renowned Alex Toth was often well-drawn. Story lines were serialized over five episodes which ran 5 minutes each, the idea being that stations could show one episode per weekday, with the climax coming on Friday.  Cliffhangers were sometimes used, as in an episode with McCloud finding a derelict spacecraft beyond the light barrier, looking inside and exclaiming "Oh my God!"  Another memorable sequence occurred with the heroes involved in a best two-of-three gladiator battle, using future visions of Roman combat.

There were several episodes involving space combat between the Interplanetary Space Force and various enemies. After the Space Angel and his crew had discovered the villains' plans or forces, he would call in reinforcements made up of one or more squadrons of the ISF. Squadrons were organized by planetary patrol areas such as the Venusian Squadron, Mars Squadron, etc. The identifying squadron symbols on the ISF ships were the ones used in astronomy charts of the time to identify the planets, such as the female symbol for the Venusian Squadron, the male symbol for the Mars Squadron and a circle with an enclosed plus sign for the Earth Squadron.

The main antagonists in the show were the Anthenians, who were modelled on a combination of Ancient Rome and Sparta; their home planet is shown in the episode involving the gladiatorial games. The city looks like Rome, including a Colosseum. The civilians are dressed in togas and the soldiers are wearing a combination of Greek/Roman armor with Corinthian-style helmets. They are armed with blaster rifles.

Another antagonist is Zorra, the Evil Queen of Space, who resembled Nefertiti, and her henchmen, "the General" and "the Major", who all spoke with Central European accents. Predating the Star Trek episode "Balance of Terror", their claim to fame is an invisible spaceship they use to disrupt interstellar trade.

In the opening sequence of "Space Hijackers (Solar Mirror)" a delta-winged spacecraft, the Starduster, docks with a space station.  The ship matches velocity and rotation with the station and is talked in with instrument assist.  This sequence foreshadows the space dock sequence of the delta-winged Orion from Stanley Kubrick's 2001: A Space Odyssey, which would be made seven years later.

The Starduster contains a smaller vessel, a space fighter flown by the Space Angel, which looks like the XF-92 and is about the same size, though with a pointed nose. It is called the "Space Dart".

The first season theme music is credited to Geordie Hormel. The second season theme music was written by Walter Greene and was originally used in Roger Corman's film War of the Satellites (1958).

Episodes
There are 52 Space Angel stories, each in five parts, totaling 260 episodes.

Space Angel in other media
Alex Toth drew a Space Angel six-page story for children's magazine Jack & Jill in 1963 to promote the Space Angel cartoon.

The episode "The Gladiators" was featured on Cinema Insomnia.

On July 29, 2008, VCI Entertainment released a DVD that contained nine Space Angel stories.

References

External links 
 Space Angel collection at the Internet Archive
 Space Angel at the Big Cartoon Database
 Space Angel at Toonopedia
 Space Angel at Cartoon-O-Rama
 

1960s American animated television series
1962 American television series debuts
1964 American television series endings
American children's animated science fiction television series
American children's animated space adventure television series
English-language television shows
Television series about astronauts
Television series by Cambria Productions